Aleksandr Sergeyevich Zernov (born July 21, 1974) is a retired  Russian professional footballer. He made his debut in the Russian Premier League in 1996 for FC Rotor Volgograd.

Honours
 Russian Premier League runner-up: 1997.
 Russian Premier League bronze: 1996.

European competition history
 UEFA Cup 1995–96 with FC Rotor Volgograd: 4 games.
 UEFA Intertoto Cup 1996 with FC Rotor Volgograd: 8 games, 3 goals.
 UEFA Cup 1997–98 with FC Rotor Volgograd: 6 games, 1 goal.
 UEFA Cup 1998–99 with FC Rotor Volgograd: 1 game, 1 goal.

1974 births
Living people
Russian footballers
Russia youth international footballers
FC Rotor Volgograd players
FC Akhmat Grozny players
FC Baltika Kaliningrad players
Russian Premier League players
FC Volga Nizhny Novgorod players
FC Sodovik Sterlitamak players
Russian football managers
Association football forwards
FC Tekstilshchik Ivanovo players